The 2007 IHF Super Globe was the third edition of the tournament. It was held in Cairo, Egypt at from  5 – 9 June 2007.

The tournament was played on round-robin format. BM Ciudad Real wins the title by defeating all the other opponents.

Teams
 Mouloudia Club d'Alger
 Metodista São Bernardo
 Al-Ahly Club Cairo
 BM Ciudad Real
 Al-Qadsiya

Round-robin

Match results

Final ranking

References

External links
Official website

IHF Super Globe
2007 IHF Super Globe
IHF Super Globe
International handball competitions hosted by Egypt
Sports competitions in Cairo